Dendrobium nativitatis, commonly known as the Christmas Island crimp orchid, is a species of epiphytic orchid that is endemic to Christmas Island, an Australian territory in the north-eastern Indian Ocean. It has long, straggly stems, flattened pseudobulbs, a single leathery leaf and a single pale yellow flower.

Description
The side lobes surround the column and the middle lobe has wavy edges near its base and two wavy ridges along its midline.

Taxonomy and naming
Dendrobium nativitatis was first formally described in 1907 by Henry Nicholas Ridley and the description was published in Journal of the Straits Branch of the Royal Asiatic Society. 

Ridley had originally described the species in 1906 and given it the name Dendrobium pectinatum, unaware that name had already been used for a different kind of orchid.

The specific epithet (nativitatis) is derived from the Latin word natus meaning "birth", implying the nativity of Christ, or Christmas, referring to the type locality.

Distribution and habitat
The Christmas Island crimp orchid is common in rainforest on the plateau and the high terraces of the island, where it favours Planchonella and Eugenia species as the host trees. It is only known from Christmas Island.

Relationships 
This orchid is closely related to Dendrobium aureilobum from Java and Sumatra.

References 

nativitatis
Endemic flora of Christmas Island
Endemic orchids of Australia
Plants described in 1907
Taxa named by Henry Nicholas Ridley